Dahlica klimeschi is a moth of the Psychidae family. It is found in Switzerland and Austria.

Adults are on wing from April to June.

References

Moths described in 1953
Psychidae